Michiel is a Dutch masculine given name equivalent to Michael and a Venetian surname.

Given name
Michiel Andrieszoon (died 1684), Dutch pirate
Michiel Bartman (born 1967), Dutch rower
Michiel Borstlap (born 1966), Dutch pianist and composer
Michiel van den Bos (born 1975), Dutch video game composer
Michiel Josias Botha (born 1947), South African diamond cutter
Michiel Bothma (born 1973), South African golfer
Michiel Braam (born 1964), Dutch jazz pianist and composer
Michiel Carree (1657–1727), Dutch painter
Michiel Coignet (1549–1623), Flemish polymath
Michiel II Coignet (1618–1663), Flemish painter, son of the above
Michiel Coxie (1499–1592), Flemish painter
Michiel Driessen (born 1959), Dutch fencer
Michiel Dudok van Heel (1924–2003), Dutch Olympic sailor
Michiel Elijzen (born 1982), Dutch road bicycle racer
Michiel G. Eman (born 1961), Aruban Prime Minister
Michiel van der Gucht (1660–1725), Flemish engraver
Michiel Hazewinkel (born 1943), Dutch mathematician
Michiel van der Heijden (born 1992), Dutch mountain biker and cyclo-cross rider
Michiel Hemmen (born 1987), Dutch footballer
Michiel Heyns (born 1943), South African author and translator
Michiel Holtackers (born 1956), Dutch politician, police officer and trade unionist
Michiel Horn (born 1939), Dutch-born Canadian historian
Michiel ten Hove (1640–1689), Grand Pensionary of Holland
Michiel Huisman (born 1981), Dutch actor and musician
Michiel van Hulten (born 1969), Dutch Labour Party politician
Michiel Engel Immenraet (1621–1683), Flemish history and portrait painter
Michiel Jonckheere (born 1990), Belgian footballer
Michiel van Kampen (born 1976), Dutch baseball player
Michiel van Kempen (born 1957), Dutch writer, art historian and literary critic
Michiel van der Klis (born 1953), Dutch astronomer
Michiel Hendrik de Kock (1898–1976), South African banker
Michiel Kramer (born 1988), Dutch footballer
Michiel van Lambalgen (born 1954), Dutch logician and cognitive scientist
Michiel Maddersteg (1662–1708), Dutch painter
Michiel Meyer Cohen (1877–1968), Dutch military commander
Michiel Jansz van Middelhoven (1562–1638), Dutch theologian portrayed by Frans Hals
Michiel Jansz. van Mierevelt (1565–1641), Dutch painter and draftsman
Michiel Mol (born 1969), Dutch businessman and Formula One team owner
Michiel van Musscher (1645–1705), Dutch painter
Michiel van Nispen (born 1982), Dutch Socialist Party politician
Michiel Daniel Overbeek (1920–2001), South African amateur astronomer 
Michiel Reyniersz Pauw (1590–1640), Dutch mayor of Amsterdam and Dutch West India Company director
Michiel Pesman (1887–1962), Dutch-born American engineer, author and landscape architect
Michiel Riedijk (born 1964), Dutch architect
Michiel de Ruyter (1607–1676), Dutch admiral, a.o. famous for the Raid on the Medway
Michiel Schapers (born 1959), Dutch tennis player
Michiel Servaes (born 1972), Dutch Labour Party politician
Michiel Smit (born 1976), Dutch nationalist politician
Michiel de Swaen (1654–1707), Flemish surgeon and rhetorician
Michiel Sweerts (1618–1664), Flemish painter and printmaker 
Michiel Thomassen (born 1979), Dutch DJ, music producer and record label owner
Michiel de Vaan (born 1973), Dutch linguist
Michiel van Veen (born 1971), Dutch VVD politician
Michiel Veenstra (born 1976), Dutch radio DJ
Tijs Michiel Verwest (born 1969), Dutch DJ and music producer known as Tiësto
Michiel Victor (1910–1998), South African sports shooter
Michiel Vos (born 1970), Dutch-born American journalist, lawyer, and jurist
Michiel de Wael (1596–1659), Dutch brewer portrayed by Frans Hals

Surname
Giovanni Michiel (1447–1503), Venetian cardinal and bishop
Marcantonio Michiel (1484–1552), Venetian nobleman, and amateur art critic
Giustina Renier Michiel (1755–1832), Venetian noblewoman

See also
Michiels, a Dutch-language patronymic surname 
Sint Michiel, village on Curaçao
Machiel (given name)
Chiel, a short version of this name

Dutch masculine given names